The 1890 Limerick Senior Hurling Championship was the fourth staging of the Limerick Senior Hurling Championship since its establishment by the Limerick County Board in 1887.

South Liberties were the defending champions.

South Liberties won the championship after a 0-01 to 0-00 defeat of Kilfinane in the final. It was their third championship title overall and their third title in succession.

Results

Final

Championship statistics

Miscellaneous

South Liberties become the first side to win three titles in a row.

References

Limerick Senior Hurling Championship
Limerick Senior Hurling Championship